Charles Stanhope may refer to:
Sir Charles Stanhope (1595-1675), 2nd Baron Stanhope of Harrington
Charles Stanhope (1708–1736), British MP for Derby 1730–6
Charles Stanhope (1673–1760), British MP for Milborne Port 1717–1722 and Aldborough 1734–5
Charles Stanhope, 3rd Earl Stanhope (1753–1816), British statesman and scientist
Charles Stanhope, 3rd Earl of Harrington (1753–1829), Commander-in-Chief, Ireland 1806–1812
Charles Stanhope, 4th Earl of Harrington (1780–1851)
Charles Stanhope, 7th Earl of Harrington  (1809–1881) 
Charles Stanhope, 8th Earl of Harrington (1844–1917), polo player
Charles Stanhope, 10th Earl of Harrington (1887–1929)
Charles Stanhope, 12th Earl of Harrington, (born 1945), 210th in the Sunday Times Rich List 2004